The 1989 Portuguese Grand Prix (formally the XXIII Grande Prémio de Portugal) was a Formula One motor race held at the Autódromo do Estoril in Estoril, Portugal on 24 September 1989. It was the thirteenth race of the 1989 Formula One World Championship.

The 71-lap race was won by Gerhard Berger, driving a Ferrari, with Alain Prost second in a McLaren-Honda and Stefan Johansson third in an Onyx-Ford. Prost's teammate and Drivers' Championship rival, Ayrton Senna, retired following a collision with the Ferrari of Nigel Mansell, who had been black-flagged for reversing in the pit lane. As a result, Prost moved 24 points clear of Senna in the championship with three races remaining.

As well as Johansson taking Onyx's only podium finish, the race also saw Pierluigi Martini lead for one lap – the first and only time the Minardi team led a Formula One race – and ten drivers from ten different teams finish in the top ten places. The race was also Prost's 150th Grand Prix start and the last start for the Coloni team, though it would continue in F1 until the end of 1991.

Qualifying

Pre-qualifying report
Onyx returned to the top of the Friday morning time sheets as Stefan Johansson was fastest by half a second. His new team-mate was Finnish driver JJ Lehto, who had replaced Bertrand Gachot since the last race, after Gachot openly criticised the team and was fired. In his first Formula One event, Lehto just missed out on pre-qualification after a suspension failure during the session, leaving him fifth. The Larrousse-Lola cars both pre-qualified again, with Philippe Alliot second and Michele Alboreto fourth. The other driver to go through to the main qualifying sessions was Roberto Moreno in third place in the Coloni.

Yannick Dalmas had originally pre-qualified in third place in his AGS, but was excluded from the session and his times were deleted, after mistakenly using the wrong tyres. Also excluded was Osella driver Nicola Larini, for missing a weight check, although he had already failed to pre-qualify, being only ninth fastest.

The other drivers who failed to proceed any further included the other Osella of Piercarlo Ghinzani, who outpaced his team-mate in sixth, and Oscar Larrauri, despite an improvement to seventh in the EuroBrun. Eighth was Gabriele Tarquini in the other AGS, ahead of the Zakspeeds of Aguri Suzuki and Bernd Schneider. Slowest by nearly four seconds was the second Coloni of Enrico Bertaggia, the third time in a row the Italian had been bottom of the time sheets.

Pre-qualifying classification

Qualifying report
Qualifying saw McLaren's Ayrton Senna take his tenth pole position of the season, with the Ferrari of Gerhard Berger alongside him on the front row. Nigel Mansell took third in the other Ferrari, with Alain Prost fourth in the other McLaren. Pierluigi Martini impressed by qualifying fifth in his Minardi, ahead of the two Williams of Riccardo Patrese and Thierry Boutsen in sixth and eighth respectively, with Alex Caffi seventh in the Dallara. The top ten was completed by Luis Pérez-Sala in the second Minardi and Martin Brundle in the Brabham. Further down the grid, Stefan Johansson took 12th in his Onyx after setting the fastest time in pre-qualifying, while another pre-qualifier, Roberto Moreno, took 15th, the best-ever grid position for the Coloni team.

The Minardi, Dallara, Brabham and Coloni teams all had their tyres supplied by Pirelli, whose special qualifying tyres were generally regarded as being superior to those of Goodyear. However, Goodyear's race tyres were still acknowledged as being superior to Pirelli's.

Qualifying classification

Race

Race report
Berger had a great start and managed to overtake Senna. Mansell was in third followed by Prost, Martini and Patrese. Berger quickly opened a lead while Senna was trying to keep Mansell behind. Then Mansell finally managed to overtake Senna and started to catch Berger. As the two Ferraris caught up with the slower cars and were starting to lap them, Mansell managed to overtake Berger. Positions at lap 24 were: Mansell, Berger, Senna and Prost. Prost was the first of the leaders to pit for new tyres from fourth position. He was quickly followed by Berger on lap 35 and then by Senna. Then came the crucial moment of the race. 
Mansell came into the pits slightly too fast, locked his tyres and missed his pit box by a few metres. Although his pit crew moved down the pit lane to try to change his tyres where he had stopped, Mansell engaged reverse gear and drove backwards the short distance into the correct spot, despite the Ferrari mechanics signalling to him to not reverse the car. After the leaders went to pit for tyres, Martini led a lap in the Minardi, the only time in F1 history that a Minardi car was at the front leading. Mansell was down in fourth. Berger, Senna and Mansell quickly overtook Martini and Mansell closed on Senna. However, as driving a car in reverse in the pit lane was expressly forbidden (the pit crew may legally push a car backwards), Mansell was given the black disqualification flag. At the start of lap 48, approaching Turn 1 even while the black flag was being waved at him Mansell tried to overtake Senna, the cars collided and both drivers were out. This damaged Senna's title chances, especially since rival Alain Prost came in second place. The race was won by Berger ahead of Prost, with Stefan Johansson a surprising third in the underfunded Onyx; the Swede did not make a pit-stop at any stage of the race and was initially on course for fifth place until both Williams-Renault entries were pulled out with overheating issues.

Race classification

Championship standings after the race

Drivers' Championship standings

Constructors' Championship standings

References

Portuguese Grand Prix
Portuguese Grand Prix
Grand Prix
Portuguese Grand Prix